FutsalFeed's Team of the Year Award is an award annually given by FutsalFeed through a poll in which fans from all over the world vote for the nominated candidates which were carefully selected by world-renowned futsal experts and FutsalFeed's editorial board. This is the only award in futsal awarded directly by fans.

Winners

2020 Best Team of the Year 
 Goalkeeper: Guitta
 Defender: Ortiz
 Winger #1: Ricardinho
 Winger #2: Sergio Lozano
 Pivot: Ferrão
 Coach: Ricardo Di Izeppe

References 

Association football trophies and awards